is the debut single by Japanese rock band Field of View under name view. It reached #97 rank for first week. It charted for one week with totally sold 325 copies. Upcoming single "Mayowanaide" is only single which didn't enter to Oricon charts.

Track list
All tracks are composed and written by Uya Asaoka and arranged by Daisuke Ikeda
Ano Toki no Naka de Bokura wa
the song was used in 7-Eleven as CM song
single and album version has different arrangements
Believe me
Ano Toki no Naka de Bokura wa (Original Karaoke)

References 

1994 singles
Japanese-language songs
Rock ballads
1994 songs